Ferdinando Martini (30 July 1840 – 24 April 1928) was an Italian writer and politician. He was governor of Eritrea for from late 1897 to early 1907.

Biography

Born in Florence, he worked as journalist and writer. He collaborated with Il Fanfulla and in 1879 he founded the Fanfulla della domenica literary supplement, for which he was editor until 1882; he was also editor of La Domenica letteraria from 1882 until 1885 and professor at the University of Pisa. He founded Giornale per i bambini in 1881 and was its editor until 1883.

In 1876 he was elected to the Parliament of the Kingdom of Italy, a position he held for 43 years. He was Minister of the Colonies in the Salandra I and Salandra II cabinets, and Minister of the Public Instruction in the first Giolitti cabinet. Martini was also governor of Eritrea from 1897 to 1907, a country that received the name from him.

On 1 March 1923 he was appointed to the Senate of the Kingdom of Italy. In 1925 he was one of the signers of Giovanni Gentile's Manifesto of the Fascist intellectuals.

In 1920 he wrote his famous literary masterpiece, about his years as governor of Eritrea:Il Diario Eritreo.

He died at Monsummano Terme in 1928.

Awards
 
  Cavaliere dell' Ordine dei Santi Maurizio e Lazzaro
  Commendatore dell' Ordine della Corona d'Italia	
  Cavaliere dell' Ordine Civile di Savoia

Literary Works
 
Chi sa il gioco non l'insegni. Proverbio in un atto in versi, Pisa, 1871
Ad una donna. Versi, Venezia, Visentini, 1872
Il primo passo e' quello dell' uscio. Milano, 1874.
Fra un sigaro e l'altro: chiacchiere di Fantasio, Milano, G. Brigola, 1876	
Cose africane, da Saati ad Abba Carima, discorsi e scritti,  Milano, F.lli Treves, 1896
Confessioni e ricordi, Firenze, Bemporad, 1922 (e successive edizioni)
Lettere (1860-1928), Milano, Mondadori, 1934
Nell'Affrica italiana, Milano, Treves, 1891
Il Quarantotto in Toscana. Firenze, Bemporad, 1918.
 Il Diario Eritreo. Roma. Vallecchi editore. 1920.	
A Pieriposa, novella antica. Milano, Treves, 1923.

Notes

Sources
Piero Buscioni. A Ferdinando Martini nel centenario della nascita. Monsummano Terme, 1941

External links
 

1841 births
1928 deaths
Writers from Florence
Italian male writers
Journalists from Florence
Politicians from Florence
Italian fascists
Italian colonial governors and administrators
Members of the Senate of the Kingdom of Italy
Recipients of the Order of Saints Maurice and Lazarus
Deputies of Legislature XII of the Kingdom of Italy
19th-century Italian politicians
Deputies of Legislature XIII of the Kingdom of Italy
Deputies of Legislature XIV of the Kingdom of Italy
Deputies of Legislature XV of the Kingdom of Italy
Deputies of Legislature XVI of the Kingdom of Italy
Deputies of Legislature XVII of the Kingdom of Italy
Deputies of Legislature XVIII of the Kingdom of Italy
Deputies of Legislature XIX of the Kingdom of Italy
Deputies of Legislature XX of the Kingdom of Italy
Deputies of Legislature XXI of the Kingdom of Italy
20th-century Italian politicians
Deputies of Legislature XXII of the Kingdom of Italy
Deputies of Legislature XXIII of the Kingdom of Italy
Deputies of Legislature XXIV of the Kingdom of Italy